Jessica Haines (born 1978) is a South African actress. She is best known for the 2008 film Disgrace in which she acts alongside John Malkovich. She frequently works in Johannesburg, Cape Town, Nairobi and Kampala. She is married to Richard Ancrum Walker, they have three children. After living in North Africa, Tunisia, for two years they then moved to Nairobi, Kenya, where they lived for 8 years. They are now based in Kampala, Uganda.

Early life and career 

Jessica Haines was born in Umtata in the Eastern Cape of South Africa. She went to boarding school at Epworth in Kwa-Zulu Natal in 1990. From a young age she had a love of the stage and did classical ballet and contemporary dance. She featured in a range of school arts programmes and participated as lead roles in musicals such as Brigadoon, Oklahoma and Fame. She won an arts scholarship in 1993 to carry on her studies at Epworth and in 1997 she was the first girl at Epworth to win her cultural honours. In 1998 she left Natal to complete an honours degree at the University of Cape Town where she first studied English Literature, Drama and Social Anthropology. The following year she auditioned for a Bachelor of Arts in Theatre and Performance at U.C.T and qualified at the end of 2001. Jessica's professional career started in 2002.

Filmography 

2021 "Reyke" (T.V. Series) "Beth Tyrone" Directed by Zee Nthuli and Catherine Cooke

Theater
 2000 Bathezda Moon (Helen Martin) directed by Lara Bye
 2001 PAX- (Domesticated woman) Directed by Jaquie Singer
 2001 Blood Wedding Directed by Gefforey Hyland
 2002 Worked for The Cape Youth Theatre Company
 2003 Macbeth Lady Macbeth directed by Litsy Katzs for the On Que Theatre Company
 2004 Worked for the On Que Theatre Company.
 2007 Wolke (lead role), written by Harry Kalmer and directed by Henriette Gryfenberg
 2018 Beautiful Outlaw, written by Jessica Waines and directed by James Cunningham (pre production)

References

External links 
 

1978 births
Living people
People from Mthatha
South African people of British descent
South African film actresses
University of Cape Town alumni
21st-century South African actresses